The 1990 Masters (officially the 1990 Benson & Hedges Masters) was a professional non-ranking snooker tournament that took place between 4 and 11 February 1990 at the Wembley Conference Centre in London, England.

Wild-card players were introduced, and the two places went to Alex Higgins and the young new professional from Thailand, James Wattana. Wattana who won his match against Dean Reynolds and played the six-times world champion Steve Davis in the next round. Higgins meanwhile lost his match against Steve James, who had won the Classic in January. This was his last appearance in the Masters.

The final meanwhile had Stephen Hendry winning his second Masters title and becoming the second player after Cliff Thorburn to retain the title by defeating John Parrott 9–4 the final. Hendry attempted a maximum break in the 11th frame before missing the 13th black. The highest break of the tournament was 111 made by both Stephen Hendry and Steve Davis, for which they both earned £3,500.

Field
Defending champion Stephen Hendry was the number 1 seed with World Champion Steve Davis seeded 2. Places were allocated to the top 16 players in the world rankings. Players seeded 15 and 16 played in the wild-card round against the wild-card selections, Alex Higgins (ranked 24), and James Wattana. Steve James and James Wattana were making their debuts in the Masters.

Wild-card round

Main draw

Final

Century breaks
Total: 3
 111  Stephen Hendry
 111  Steve Davis
 103  Jimmy White

References 

Masters (snooker)
Masters Snooker
Masters Snooker
Masters (snooker)
Masters (snooker)